Katarina Zavatska was the defending champion but chose not to participate.

Anhelina Kalinina won the title, defeating Dalma Gálfi in the final, 6–2, 6–2.

Seeds

Draw

Finals

Top half

Bottom half

References

Main Draw

Grand Est Open 88 - Singles